Manjula Anagani is an Indian obstetrician and gynaecologist.

Early life and education 

Later, she underwent higher training in prenatal genetic evaluation, infertility, ultrasonography and minimally invasive procedures such as hysteroscopy and laparoscopy.

Career 
According to The Hindu, Anagani has pioneered new laparoscopic techniques and contributed work on primary amenorrhoea, stem cell procedures for endometrial regeneration, and a technique of creating a neovagina.

In 2015, she was awarded the Padma Shri, the fourth highest Indian civilian award, by the Government of India. In 2016, Anagani also received an Indian Affairs Indian of the Year award at the 2016 India Leadership Conclave in Mumbai. That same year, she also was recognised by the Guinness World Records for removing the largest number of uterine fibroids in a single operation. She and her team removed 84 fibroids weighing 4 kilograms in total with the largest weighing 1.07 kg, operating through a minimally-invasive low transverse mini-laparotomy incision.

Anagani has also co-founded a non-governmental organization named Pratyusha to campaign for women's health.
She is doing lot for the women empowerment, On February 8, 2020 she was guest speaker and participated in SHE Safe Walk, Kudos to her initiations  she was an inspiration to the rest of the world

Personal life 
Anagani is married to Kolli Suresh.

References

Recipients of the Padma Shri in medicine
Indian obstetricians
Indian gynaecologists
Indian women gynaecologists
Living people
Osmania University alumni
Scientists from Hyderabad, India
20th-century Indian medical doctors
20th-century Indian women scientists
Medical doctors from Hyderabad, India
20th-century women physicians
Year of birth missing (living people)